Mundumala is a town and municipality in western Tanore Upazila, Rajshahi District, Bangladesh. The major village of Tanore is in Rajshahi Division.

Geography
Mundumala's municipality is Old Badhar Union. It is bounded by Badhar Union to the north and north-east, Kolma Union to the east, Pakri to the south and Amnura to the west.

Rivers
There are no rivers in this municipality, but a large canal goes into it.

Economy
Apart from the usual agricultural products of Bangladesh, such as rice, potatoes and lentils, Mundumala and its neighboring village are specially suited from various crops such as watermelons, sugarcane, mangoes and jackfruits. Main economical products in Mundumala is paddy. Before 1995, farmers cultivated one time in season but since then they cultivate three times a season.

Points of interest
 Old Mosjid Mundumala Dokkhin para
 Big banyan tree In Mainpur.

Administration
The town is governed by Mundumala municipality. Wards of Mundumala municipality are:
 Mundumala Ward
 Sadipur Ward
 Pachondor Ward
 Moinpur Ward
 Ayra Ward
 Kamalpur Ward
 Hasnapara Ward
 Chuniapara Ward

Education

Mundumala Govt. High School is another institution of Tanore Thana. Fazor Ali Molla College is another starting point of students. Mundumala is also an important educational center and termed as 'education village' of Tanore. Major educational institutes include:

 Mundumala Primary School
 Mundumala Govt. High School
 Mundumala Aliya Madrasa
 Mundumala Girls School
 Mundumala Dakhil Mohila Madrasa
 Mundumala Kawmi Madrasa
 Mundumala Kindergarten School
 Mundumala Mohila College
 Mundumala Fazor Ali Degree College

References

Rajshahi District